This article concerns the period 289 BC – 280 BC.

References